Fusa is a former municipality in the old Hordaland county, Norway. It existed from 1856 until its dissolution in 2020. It was located east of the city of Bergen in the Midhordland region. The administrative centre of the municipality was the village of Eikelandsosen. Other villages in the municipality include Fusa, Holdhus, Holmefjord, Vinnes, Strandvik, and Sundvord. The Frank Mohn company's Fusa marine division is headquartered here, with almost 500 employees. On 1 January 2020, the municipality became part of the new Bjørnafjorden Municipality in Vestland county.

Prior to its dissolution in 2020, the  municipality was the 247th largest by area out of the 422 municipalities in Norway. Fusa was the 234th most populous municipality in Norway with a population of 3,895.

General information

The district of Fusa was separated from the municipality of Os in 1856 to become a separate municipality. Initially, Fusa had 3,173 residents. On 1 January 1903, the municipality of Fusa was divided into three separate municipalities: Hålandsdal in the east (population: 647), Strandvik in the south (population: 1,876), and a much smaller Fusa in the west (population: 1,072).

During the 1960s, there were many municipal mergers across Norway due to the work of the Schei Committee. On 1 January 1964, there were two changes to Fusa municipality. The Bogstrand area of Fusa, located on the west side of the Fusafjorden (population: 28) was transferred to the municipality of Os. Also on that date, the municipalities of Hålandsdal (population: 528) and Strandvik (population: 2,053) were merged with Fusa (population: 1,466) to form a much larger municipality of Fusa.

On 1 January 2020, the neighboring municipalities of Os and Fusa were merged to form the new Bjørnafjorden Municipality.

Name
The municipality (originally the parish) is named after the old Fusa farm, since the first Fusa Church was built there. The name may be derived from the Old Norse word fúss which means "eager" (possibly referring to a strong stream). The name may instead have been derived from the old verb fusa, which had some meaning referring to running water. Until 1918, the name was written Fuse.

Coat of arms
The coat of arms was granted on 27 September 1991. The arms show three blue spirals on a gray background. They symbolise the strong currents in the Fusafjorden and Bjørnafjorden. The spirals also symbolise the many giant's kettles (jettegryte) in the municipality, which were created by the water in the rocks.

Churches
The Church of Norway had one parish within the municipality of Fusa. It is part of the Hardanger og Voss prosti (deanery) in the Diocese of Bjørgvin.

Geography

Fusa was located at the inner end of the Bjørnafjorden and its small arm, the Fusafjorden. The municipality of Os was located across the fjord to the west, Samnanger Municipality was to the north, Kvam Municipality was to the east, and Kvinnherad Municipality was to the south. Lakes in Fusa included Gjønavatnet, Skogseidvatnet, and Henangervatnet.

Government
All municipalities in Norway, including Fusa, are responsible for primary education (through 10th grade), outpatient health services, senior citizen services, unemployment and other social services, zoning, economic development, and municipal roads. The municipality is governed by a municipal council of elected representatives, which in turn elect a mayor.  The municipality falls under the Bergen District Court and the Gulating Court of Appeal.

Municipal council
The municipal council  of Fusa was made up of 21 representatives that are elected to four year terms. The party breakdown of the final municipal council was as follows:

Mayor
In 2007, Fusa participated in a trial where the mayor was directly elected. The sitting mayor, Hans S. Vindenes, won the election with 51.8% of the votes.

See also
List of former municipalities of Norway

References

External links

Municipal fact sheet from Statistics Norway 

 
Bjørnafjorden
Former municipalities of Norway
1856 establishments in Norway
2020 disestablishments in Norway